The Tanzanian vlei rat (Otomys lacustris) is a species of rodent in the family Muridae.
It is found in Kenya, Malawi, and Tanzania.
Its natural habitats are subtropical or tropical high-altitude grassland and swamps.
It is threatened by habitat loss.

References

Otomys
Mammals described in 1933
Taxonomy articles created by Polbot
Taxa named by Glover Morrill Allen